Paduka Sri Sultan Zainal Rashid Al-Mu'adzam Shah I ibni Almarhum Sultan Ahmad Tajuddin Halim Shah II (1803 – 13 March 1854) was the 23rd Sultan of Kedah. His reign was from 1845 to 1854.

Family
 Children with Wan Maheran/Wan Masheran binti Wan Mohd Sidek
 Tunku Ahmad Tajuddin
 Tunku Puteri
 Tunku Yaakob
 Tunku Yusof
 Tunku Rahimah
 Tunku Sofiah
 Tunku Zam Zam
 Tunku Aisha
 Tunku Ziauddin 
 Tunku Jahara

External links
 List of Sultans of Kedah

1803 births
1854 deaths
19th-century Sultans of Kedah